Edward Taylor (sometimes referred to as Edward Hallows Taylor; 7 March 1887 – 5 July 1956) was an England international footballer who played 8 games as a goalkeeper for his country.

Honours
Huddersfield Town
 First Division (3): 1923–24, 1924–25, 1925–26

References

External links
England profile
Everton profile

1887 births
1956 deaths
Association football goalkeepers
English Football League players
English footballers
England international footballers
Oldham Athletic A.F.C. players
Huddersfield Town A.F.C. players
Everton F.C. players
Wrexham A.F.C. players
Footballers from Liverpool
English Football League representative players